The Guggernellgrat is a mountain of the Plessur Alps, located south of Arosa in the canton of Graubünden.

References

External links

 Guggernellgrat on Hikr

Mountains of the Alps
Mountains of Switzerland
Mountains of Graubünden